The following is a list of events affecting Philippine television in 2021. Events listed include television show debuts, finales, cancellations, and channel launches, closures and rebrandings, as well as information about controversies and carriage disputes.

Events

January
 January 1
 After past six years of broadcasting in the Philippines, Disney XD has ceased its operations by Disney Branded Television (a unit of Disney General Entertainment Content owned by The Walt Disney Company) across Southeast Asia due to a review of Disney's business direction and the upcoming launch of their own streaming service in the region.
 Sky Cable terminated GINX Esports TV and Stingray Classica on its line-up due to the expiration of Sky's contract with the said networks. GINX Esports TV continued to air via Cignal and G Sat under the distribution by Mediahouse/Club TV (under Mimyuni Media Entertainment from Kick Media) and SES, while Stingray Classica continued to air via G Sat and selected nationwide cable operators.
 January 2 - Cignal terminated eight Fox Networks Group (a subsidiary of The Walt Disney Company) channels: Channel V, Fox Crime, Fox Family Movies, Fox News Channel, Fox Sports 3, FX, Nat Geo People and Star Chinese Channel, on its line-up due to the expiration of Cignal's contract with the company. Meanwhile, ten Disney/Fox channels continued to air on their line-up.
 January 4
 Cignal launched eleven channels on their line-up: Aniplus, Blue Ant Extreme, Jeepney TV, Knowledge Channel, K-Plus, Metro Channel, Nick Jr., Paramount Network (branded from Paramount Channel as prior to the announced February 1 rebranding), TAP Edge, TAP Sports and Telenovela Channel.
 Cablelink terminated seven channels: Colours, Disney Junior, Fox Family Movies, K Movies Pinoy, Nat Geo Wild, One Sports+ and Sari-Sari Channel, on its line-up due to the expiration of Cablelink's contract and unpaid carriage fees with the said companies. In addition, Cablelink launched Tagalized Movie Channel on their line-up.
 January 12 - TV Maria celebrated its 15th anniversary of broadcasting.
 January 21
 CNN Philippines (via CNN International), One News, and both TAP Edge and TAP TV (via NBC News), as well as other international news channels (including BBC World News, Bloomberg Television, CNBC Asia, CNA and Fox News) aired the special coverage of the Inauguration of Joe Biden live from Washington, D.C.
 ABS-CBN Corporation and PLDT's Beneficial Trust Fund (MediaQuest Holdings through TV5 Network, Inc. and Cignal TV), in collaboration with Brightlight Productions, announced a partnership agreement to air Sunday noontime variety show and afternoon movie block via TV5 in nationwide areas beginning on January 24.
 Tunay na Buhay celebrated its tenth anniversary on Philippine television.
 January 29 - VivaMax made its official launched after a month and 14 days of being in soft operations on December 15, 2020.

February
 February 1 - Comedy Central (after past seven years of broadcasting in the Philippines) and MTV China have ceased its operations by ViacomCBS across Southeast Asia. In addition, Paramount Channel Asia rebranded as Paramount Network Asia.
 February 4 - MediaQuest Holdings, through Cignal TV announced a 3-year deal with the Premier Volleyball League to aired the games beginning with the 4th season (17th overall season for the former Shakey's V-League) on free-to-air network One Sports and on the cable and satellite channel One Sports+. This is the second league organized by Sports Vision to broadcast on Cignal and One Sports (the first one being Spikers' Turf since 2018). This is also the third time that the volleyball league games broadcast on the company since 2005–2006 on ABC-5 (now TV5; under Associated Broadcasting Company, now TV5 Network, Inc.) and 2012–2013 on Hyper (now One Sports+; under MediaQuest) both as the Shakey's V-League, and marked the end of its stint with ABS-CBN Corporation following the non-renewal of its congressional franchise on July 10, 2020, and the dissolution of ABS-CBN Sports division to close its business operations on August 31, 2020, during the COVID-19 pandemic in the Philippines.
 February 6 - JM Yosures of Taguig was hailed as Tawag ng Tanghalan Year 4 Grand Champion on It's Showtime.
 February 7 - GMA Network launched "GMA Now", a digital TV dongle for Android smartphones.
 February 10 - G Sat terminated four Mediahouse/Club TV (under Mimyuni Media Entertainment from Kick Media) and SES channels: GINX Esports TV, Health & Wellness, Luxe & Life and Pet & Pal, as well as four other channels: Amazing Discoveries TV, Fight COVID-19 (information channel), Sonlife Broadcasting Network and Stingray Classica on its line-up due to the revamping of the provider's channel space assignments. Meanwhile, two Mediahouse/Club TV (under Mimyuni Media Entertainment from Kick Media) and SES channels: Motorvision TV and My Cinema Europe, continued to air on their line-up. In addition, G Sat launched eight channels on their line-up: Da Vinci Kids, DreamWorks Channel, Myx, Paramount Network, TAP Edge, TAP Sports, TAP TV and Travel Channel, as well as two returned channels: Aniplus and K-Plus.
 February 14 - My Only Radio relaunched as "MOR Entertainment", transitioned to a new media (online) entity network from a broadcast terrestrial radio network via multiple digital platforms on Facebook, iWantTFC, Kumu, Spotify and YouTube.
 February 20
 Sky Cable terminated Life TV on its line-up due to the expiration of Sky's contract with the network. Meanwhile, the network continued to air via BEAM TV.
 Abby Trinidad was hailed as the MNL48's third-generation center girl in the girl group's third general election held on It's Showtime.
 February 22 - GMA News TV (just six days before the network's tenth anniversary of broadcasting) rebranded to GTV, a secondary channel for news, entertainment and sports content in lieu with their parent network. Prior to the rebranding announcement on February 9 by GMA Network, Inc., GMA News TV has been increasing generalist content (similar to the former Citynet Television and Q) since September 2020 where news and public affairs content were decreasing as a result of the COVID-19 pandemic. GTV's programming include the upcoming NCAA Philippines (where GMA Network signed a 5-year deal with the league on November 21, 2020, which led the reason behind the network's rebranding) and GMA News TV's current and existing programming such as weekly public affairs series and newscasts–including Balitanghali, State of the Nation, GMA Regional TV Weekend News (later dropped the "GMA" moniker as Regional TV Weekend News), GMA Regional TV Strip (later dropped the "GMA" moniker as Regional TV Strip), Dobol B sa News TV (later renamed as Dobol B TV), News TV Live (later dropped the "TV" word as News Live) and the simulcast of 24 Oras (for weeknight and later weekend editions), along with movie blocks, Asianovelas and animated series. Following the rebranding of the domestic network to its current name, the News TV brand continued to use through its international version.
 February 28 - Five GMA News TV's (now GTV) original programs: Brigada, Dobol B TV, iJuander, News TV Live and State of the Nation, celebrated its tenth anniversary on Philippine television.

March
 March 1 - Pop Talk celebrated its tenth anniversary on Philippine television.
 March 5
 Front Row celebrated its tenth anniversary on Philippine television.
 ABS-CBN Corporation and PLDT's Beneficial Trust Fund (MediaQuest Holdings through TV5 Network, Inc. and Cignal TV) inked an extended partnership agreement for the airing of weeknight primetime shows produced and distributed from ABS-CBN Entertainment via TV5 in nationwide areas beginning on March 8.
 March 6 - Good News Kasama si Vicky Morales celebrated its tenth anniversary on Philippine television.
 March 8 - TV5 unveiled a new relaunched slogan entitled TV5 TodoMax and a revamped programming grid that divided into five blocks: TodoMax Kids (cartoons and kids-oriented), TodoMax Serbisyo (public service), TodoMax Panalo (weekday noontime and afternoon line-up), TodoMax Primetime (later renamed as TodoMax Primetime Singko; weeknight primetime line-up) and TodoMax Weekend (weekend line-up).
 March 10 - The Maharlika Pilipinas Basketball League has resumed their play after almost a year due to the COVID-19 pandemic in the Philippines and the ABS-CBN franchise renewal controversy (which led the closure of its sports division) to finish off the 2019–20 season in a bubble setup in the Subic Bay Freeport Zone, with the games being aired on A2Z, iWantTFC and TFC.
 March 14 - Liofer Pinatacan of Zamboanga del Sur was hailed as the winner of Pinoy Big Brother: Connect.
 March 16 - CNN Philippines implemented a lay off program covering some of its employees due to COVID-19 pandemic in the Philippines.
 March 17
 People's Television Network temporary stopped its broadcast and limited its programming through online to allow the disinfection of its studios in Quezon City.
 PTV's Twitter account posted a controversial tweet about the attacking of President Rodrigo Duterte with the hashtag #DutertePalpak and the mention of the South Korean boyband group BTS, causing the president pertained to the COVID-19 pandemic as a "small thing in our lives". The network later apologized and filed for an investigation against the mastermind behind the said tweet.
 ABS-CBN Entertainment and WeTV iflix signed a multi-year partnership to air early access of ABS-CBN's primetime shows on the partners' two streaming services starting on March 20.
 March 22 - Four GMA News programs: Balitanghali, Saksi, State of the Nation and Unang Hirit, became the newest addition of newscasts to incorporate simultaneous sign language interpretation for the deaf and hard of hearing on its broadcast, as well as the online livestream on YouTube being converted to high definition.
 March 29–31 - In protocol response to the emerge wake on the threat surge of uprising COVID-19 cases in the Philippines and the restrictions caused by the second Enhanced Community Quarantine in Greater Manila Area due to the wave of virus mutations in different variants, It's Showtime and Eat Bulaga! cancelled the productions of their annual "Lenten Drama Specials" for the second year. The former aired replays since their second suspension was on March 18, while the latter replaced with the filmed pre-produced episodes before the start of the second lockdown.

April
 April 1–3
 GTV revived its Holy Week special programming every Easter Triduum, after 10 years since GMA News TV never used this practice in 2011.
 Solar Entertainment Corporation announced a 3-day break on four digital free-to-air and pay TV channels: ETC, Front Row Channel, Solar Learning and Solar Sports, in observance of Holy Week. Meanwhile, Shop TV continued to air on pay TV platforms.
 The English-language ABS-CBN News Channel along with simultaneous telecast of TeleRadyo broadcast a special Holy Week programming as prior to the surge of COVID-19 cases in the Philippines since last year.
 The Healing Eucharist aired its special liturgical masses during the Paschal Triduum for this year. The Holy Week Masses was filmed on the ABS-CBN Chapel, instead from the normal studio used in the past years, and it was broadcast simultaneously for three days on cable TV via Kapamilya Channel, online via Kapamilya Online Live and iWantTFC, and on free-to-air via A2Z (where the network has a right of first refusal to carry as part of a programming agreement with ABS-CBN Corporation along with SVD-Mission Communications Foundation's "Seven Last Words", due to the Jesus Is Lord Church Worldwide's ownership). Meanwhile, Jeepney TV continued to carry on a delay basis.
 April 2
 SVD-Mission Communications Foundation's "Seven Last Words" returned for pre-recorded this year, after the 2020 edition was cancelled due to the COVID-19 pandemic in the Philippines and the ABS-CBN franchise renewal controversy (which caused their television networks to shutdown), and it was broadcast simultaneously on cable TV via Kapamilya Channel, online via Kapamilya Online Live and iWantTFC, and on free-to-air via A2Z (MCFI's director Fr. Bel San Luis later acknowledged Jesus Is Lord Church Worldwide and ZOE Broadcasting Network founder Eddie Villanueva during the special program's closing message, as the church's channel ownership also refused to carry Catholic liturgical masses during the Paschal Triduum due to their programming agreement with ABS-CBN Corporation). Meanwhile, Jeepney TV continued to air on a delay basis.
 The Dominican Fathers of the Philippines' "Siete Palabras" was pre-recorded again for the second year filmed at the Santo Domingo Church in Quezon City and other locations affiliated with the Dominican Fathers throughout Luzon (including the University of Santo Tomas in Manila and the Minor Basilica of Our Lady of the Rosary of Manaoag in Manaoag, Pangasinan) due to the COVID-19 pandemic in the Philippines, and it was broadcast on television via GMA Network (selected GMA Regional TV stations in Visayas and Mindanao were pre-empted and replaced with their own local versions) for the 13th year and on radio via Radyo Veritas in Metro Manila as well as other Catholic Media Network affiliated stations nationwide.
 April 3
 APT Entertainment cancelled the productions of their annual "Black Saturday Lenten Drama Special" for the second year due to the COVID-19 pandemic in the Philippines, which suppose to aired on GMA Network. In lieu of the special, the network replaced by the marathon of First Yaya.
 Jesuit Communications Foundation Holy Week Specials returned for productions after a year of absence due to the COVID-19 pandemic in the Philippines, with "Fiesta: Ang Makulay na Pananampalatayang Pilipino" as this year's theme. It also marks the first JESCOM Holy Week special to broadcast on GMA Network, ending its 15-year stint with ABS-CBN Corporation following the non-renewal of its congressional franchise on July 10, 2020, and the first JESCOM special to be aired on the said network after 5 years since "Mabuhay Lolo Kiko" in 2015 (GMA replaced from the planned Stations of the Cross with Pope Francis in Vatican City for the second year due to the COVID-19 pandemic in Vatican City).
 April 5
 GMA Network launched its brand new movie channel on digital terrestrial television, I Heart Movies.
 Cignal launched five channels on their line-up: CinemaWorld, Fight Sports, GEM, TechStorm and WakuWaku Japan.
 April 9–11 - GTV became the official broadcaster of the 191st General Conference of the Church of Jesus Christ of Latter-Day Saints on national free-to-air (analog and digital) and cable TV via satellite delay from the Conference Center in Salt Lake City, Utah, making the second time the channel aired the conference.
 April 12 - Intercontinental Broadcasting Corporation temporary suspended their network produced programs as prior to its limited broadcasting hours which only airs DepEd TV every Monday to Saturday at 7:00 AM to 7:00 PM and several programs produced by blocktimers on Sunday at 7:00 AM to 10:00 AM due to limited programming redundancies and the "quarantine safety protocol issues". Their regular programming schedule line-up and broadcasting hours were resumed its Sunday schedule on April 25, the Weekday schedule on May 3, and the Saturday schedule on May 8.
 April 28 - Newsline Philippines, an independent regional news outlet and media organization bureau service based in Davao under Altheni Advertisement and Consultants founded in 2016, expanded into a television channel as it broadcast via selected key areas in the Philippines.
 April 29 - GMA Network and iQiyi sealed a multi-year deal to air GMA's entertainment programs on the latter's streaming service.

May
 May 1
 After one year and nine months of broadcasting, K Movies Pinoy has ceased its operations by Viva Entertainment due to permanent discontinuation of its telecast by the content provider. Meanwhile, all Filipino-dubbed Korean movies continued to air on its sister channel, Tagalized Movie Channel and on the streaming service, VivaMax.
 Sky Cable terminated Fight Sports on its line-up due to the expiration of Sky's contract with the network. Meanwhile, the network continued to air via Cignal and G Sat.
 ABS-CBN News Channel celebrated its 25th anniversary of broadcasting.
 May 3 - After two years of broadcasting, One Media Network was rebranded as Golden Nation Network.
 May 8 - Jehramae Trangia of Cebu was hailed as the winner of the second season of Born to Be a Star.
 May 15 - Maalaala Mo Kaya celebrated its 30th anniversary on Philippine television.
 May 20 - TV5 unveiled a new slogan, station ID or theme jingle entitled Iba sa 5 and a remodify-colored of the current 2019 logo (which is almost similar to the former 2004–2008 slogan of its predecessor, ABC entitled Iba Tayo! and the color scheme of its sister companies, Cignal and PLDT).
 May 28 - Jessie Pascua (also known as "The Ihaws of Us") of Bulacan was hailed as Versus 1st Grand Champion on It's Showtime.
 May 30 - Singer Klarisse de Guzman (impersonated as Patti LaBelle) was proclaimed the grand winner of the third season of Your Face Sounds Familiar.

June
 June 1 - Sky Cable terminated Miao Mi on its line-up due to the expiration of Sky's contract with the network. In addition, Fight Sports returned its broadcast after a month-long termination also due to the provider's expired contract.
 June 5 - G Sat terminated Aniplus and K-Plus on its line-up due to the revamping of the provider's channel space assignments. Meanwhile, both networks continued to air via Cignal, Sky Cable and Cablelink. In addition, G Sat launched Arirang TV and KBS World on their line-up.
 June 6 - Vianna Ricafranca of Albay was emerged as the winner of Centerstage.
 June 13 - ABS-CBN Corporation celebrated its 75th anniversary of corporate formation since its foundation in 1946.
 June 20 - Sky Cable launched Loveworld Asia on their line-up.
 June 28 - TeleRadyo switched its airing of aspect ratio format quality on the channel feed and its programming to high-definition (16:9) as being converted its mitigation of reception through Sky Cable and other cable providers, iWantTFC, TFC IPTV, and other digital platforms after more than 14 years on the usage of broadcast video picture resolution that migrated from standard-definition (4:3).
 June 30 - Selected ABS-CBN contents from local programming titles such as originals, movies and series, acquired international distributions, and live channels on iWantTFC and WeTV offered free access with an optional monthly premium subscription of binge-watch to users.

July
 July 1
 After past nine years of broadcasting in the Philippines, Red by HBO has ceased its operations by Home Box Office, Inc. (operated as a unit of WarnerMedia) across Asia due to lack of advertisements, as well as change in business direction. In addition, HBO GO also removed Asian films from the service, as would focus on Hollywood movies and series.
 Cignal and SatLite launched two channels on their line-up: Cinema One and Myx.
 Cablelink launched CGTN Documentary on their line-up.
 July 8 - Dateline Philippines celebrated its 25th anniversary on Philippine television.
 July 23–August 8 - The 2020 Summer Olympics was held in Tokyo, Japan after a year of announced postponement on March 24, 2020, due to the COVID-19 pandemic in Japan. On June 11, MediaQuest Holdings (Cignal TV and TV5 Network, Inc.) and their sister companies PLDT-Smart Communications awarded the local rights to the annual games as part of a deal with the Philippine Olympic Committee which aired on TV5, One Sports, One Sports+, Cignal Play and Smart Gigafest. It also marked both the fifth overall consecutive games of TV5/Cignal and the third consecutive summer games of MediaQuest (which introduced for the 2012 Summer Olympic Games co-shared with Solar Entertainment Corporation), ever-record for a Philippine broadcasting company. Although the International Olympic Committee stated to be held as schedule, postponement of the Summer Olympics to the following year was made in March 2020 with its new opening and closing ceremony date range were announced on March 30, 2020.
 July 28 - Converge ICT, in partnership with Pacific Kabelnet (an affiliate cable company), formally launched its internet protocol television service, Vision.

August
 August 1 - After nine years and sixteen days, Viva TV reverted to Viva Cinema, after the former transitioned to Viva Entertainment's television production arm unit while the latter returned its broadcast operations as the third incarnation channel featuring archived movies and concerts.
 August 2 - Cignal TV, in partnership with APT Entertainment, formally launched its first local comedian channel on Philippine television, Buhay Komedya (BuKo) Channel.
 August 22 - Swak na Swak celebrated its 15th anniversary on Philippine television.
 August 23 - TeleRadyo temporary suspended the productions of its programming and replaced by the ABS-CBN News Channel–simulcast programs due to the safety precautions of COVID-19 protocols. The channel's regular programming were later resumed the following day.
 August 24–September 5 - The 2020 Summer Paralympics was held in Tokyo, Japan after a year of announced postponement on March 24, 2020, due to the COVID-19 pandemic in Japan. TAP Digital Media Ventures Corporation awarded the local rights to the annual games which aired on TAP Sports and TAP Go.

September
 September 1
 Sky Cable terminated tvN on its line-up due to the expiration of Sky's contract with the network. Meanwhile, the network continued to air via Cignal and other cable providers.
 Rock Entertainment Holdings rebranded two pay TV channels previously owned by Blue Ant Media: Blue Ant Entertainment to Rock Entertainment and Blue Ant Extreme to Rock Extreme.
 September 1–30 - Cignal launched nine channels on their line-up by respective date: Lotus Macau and Tagalized Movie Channel on September 1; TAP TV on September 5; UAAP Varsity Channel on September 8; DreamWorks Channel (SD in separate Tagalog-dubbed feed and HD in main English-dubbed feed) on September 11; Premier Sports, TAP Action Flix and TAP Movies on September 20; and Moonbug Kids on September 30.
 September 8 - Cignal TV, in partnership with University Athletic Association of the Philippines, formally launched its collegiate sports channel on Philippine television, UAAP Varsity Channel.
 September 10 - TV5 Network, Inc. formally launched its digital terrestrial television brand, Sulit TV.
 September 13 - DepEd-NCR Prime was launched as a supplementary digital educational channel catered for Kindergarten to Grade 3 students owned by Solar Entertainment Corporation (under Solar Learning) in partnership with the Department of Education (under DepEd TV).
 September 16 - ABS-CBN Corporation and Globe Telecom's Group Retirement Fund (Bethlehem Holdings, Inc. through Broadcast Enterprises and Affiliated Media) signed a partnership deal to broadcast an ABS-CBN owned educational channel via BEAM TV (through its digital TV channel frequency on a dedicated subchannel) in nationwide areas beginning on October 5.
 September 18
 Reiven Umali of Cavite was hailed as Tawag ng Tanghalan Year 5 Grand Champion on It's Showtime.
 Jesus Is Lord Church Worldwide (ZOE Broadcasting Network) and Philippine Collective Media Corporation entered a partnership agreement for affiliation to broadcast A2Z by airing its programming including from ABS-CBN Entertainment and network-produced programs via Channel 12 (PCMC's owned TV frequency through digital subchannel of PRTV) in selected parts of Eastern Visayas.

October
 October 1
 All pay television operators and providers in the Philippines have added or terminated a number of various channels and networks on their respective listing line-ups.
 Cignal terminated Shop TV on its line-up due to the expiration of Cignal's contract with the network. Meanwhile, the network continued to air via digital subchannel of Channel 21 in Metro Manila, Sky Cable and other cable providers.
 Fourteen Disney/Fox/Star linear channels in the Philippines (Channel V, Disney Channel, Disney Junior, Fox, Fox Action Movies, Fox Crime, Fox Family Movies, Fox Life, Fox Movies, Fox Sports, Fox Sports 2, Fox Sports 3, FX and Nat Geo People) along with four other channels (SCM Legend, Star Movies China, Star Sports 1 and Star Sports 2) have ceased its operations by The Walt Disney Company (under Disney Branded Television, a unit of Disney General Entertainment Content and Fox Networks Group, a subsidiary of Disney International Operations) in most of Asia across Hong Kong, Mainland China, South Korea and Southeast Asia (leaving the broadcast feeds from a few Asian territories across India and parts of East Asia including Japan where only for some selected networks in Asia-Pacific region) due to the company's shifted focus on its direct-to-consumer business model of online streaming service upon the launch in favor of both Disney+ and Disney+ Hotstar in the region. Meanwhile, four remaining owned channels (National Geographic, Nat Geo Wild, Star Chinese Channel and Star Chinese Movies) along with four non-owned channels (Baby TV, Fox News, Star Gold and StarPlus) continued to air its broadcast in the countries of pan-Asia.
 After 12 years of broadcasting, Global Pinoy Cinema has ceased its operations by Global Satellite Technology Services due to permanent discontinuation of its broadcast operations and repetitive airing of local film libraries, as well as lack of programming redundancies.
 G Sat launched eight channels on their line-up: beIN Sports 1, beIN Sports 2, HBO Family, HBO Hits, HBO Signature, MyZen TV, Tagalized Movie Channel and TechStorm.
 Cablelink terminated Baby TV, Fox News and National Geographic on its line-up due to the expiration of Cablelink's contract with the said networks. Baby TV continued to air via Sky Cable; Fox News continued to air via G Sat and Sky Cable; and National Geographic continued to air via Cignal, G Sat and Sky Cable. In addition, Cablelink launched 21 channels on their line-up: Asian Food Network, Chillayo, Cinemachi Action, Cinemachi Docu, Cinemachi Family, Cinemachi Xtra, Discovery Asia, Eurosport, Health & Wellness, HGTV, Homey's, Lolly Kids, Luxe & Life, Motorvision TV, Pet & Pal, Planet Fun, Rock Extreme, Sportyfy, Travelxp, Wow! and ZooMoo.
 TAP Digital Media Ventures Corporation launched a TAP Sports' secondary sports channel, Premier Sports; as well as two movie channels: TAP Action Flix and TAP Movies.
 October 5 - Knowledge Channel resumed its free-to-air broadcast through BEAM TV's digital subchannel after almost a year of halt broadcast due to the lapsed of its broadcast franchise in 2020.
 October 11 - ABS-CBN Entertainment and iQiyi signed a partnership to produced locally-exclusive Filipino originals on its owned streaming service, where the multi-title content deal for global audience made official on November 23.
 October 13 - Discovery+, a streaming service owned by Discovery, Inc. through its partner Globe Telecom, was launched and became available in the Philippines.
 October 18
 Sky Cable launched five channels on their line-up: Premier Sports, SPOTV, SPOTV2, TAP Action Flix and TAP Movies.
 Eclat Media Group launched two TV channels in the Philippines: SPOTV and SPOTV2.
 October 29 - GMA Network celebrated its 60th anniversary of broadcasting as a television network.

November
 November 6 - Yey! resumed its partial broadcast as a programming block via Jeepney TV (everyday morning through YeY Weekdays and YeY Weekend) and Kapamilya Channel (Saturday morning through YeY Weekend–thus replacing Just Love Kids, with an online web portal remained) after almost a year of halt broadcast due to the lapsed of its broadcast franchise in 2020.
 November 7 - Versus (boyband) and Yara (girl group), both of Manila, were hailed as POPinoy Grand Champions.
 November 14 - Telenovela Channel celebrated its tenth anniversary of broadcasting.
 November 15 - Sky Cable launched DreamWorks Channel (SD in separate Tagalog-dubbed feed and HD in main English-dubbed feed) on their line-up.
 November 21 - The World Tonight celebrated its 55th anniversary on Philippine television.
 November 27 - Sky Cable launched DepEd-NCR Prime on their line-up.

December
 December 2 - The Government of the Philippines (Presidential Communications Operations Office) and TAP Digital Media Ventures Corporation announced a deal with the Maharlika Pilipinas Basketball League to aired the games beginning with the invitational tournament on December 11 via free-to-air network Intercontinental Broadcasting Corporation, the cable and satellite channel TAP Sports, and online livestreaming via TAP Go and the Facebook pages of MPBL and Chooks-to-Go Pilipinas. This is the first time that TAP DMV air a local programming (where the company mostly feature an acquired international contents) and the return of basketball games to broadcast on IBC (the last one being Community Basketball Association since 2019). This is also marked the end of its stint with ABS-CBN Corporation following the non-renewal of its congressional franchise on July 10, 2020, and the dissolution of ABS-CBN Sports division to close its business operations on August 31, 2020, during the COVID-19 pandemic in the Philippines.
 December 6 - G Sat terminated Fight Sports on its line-up due to unknown reason. Meanwhile, the network continued to air via Cignal and Sky Cable. In addition, G Sat launched Premier Sports on its line-up.
 December 19 - Mariane Osabel of Lanao del Norte won the fourth season of The Clash.

Unknown (dates)
 February - Blackbox Studios launched its Filipino-owned independent streaming service, RAD.
 November - Highland TV was launched as a regional TV channel based in Baguio by Regional News Group and Tirad Pass Network where it broadcast via the digital subchannel of Global Satellite Technology Services.

Debuts

Major networks

A2Z

The following are programs that debuted on A2Z:

Re-runs

Notes
^  Originally aired on ABS-CBN
^  Originally aired on GMA
^  Originally aired on Yey!
^  Originally aired on Jeepney TV
^  Originally aired on Hero (now defunct)
^  Originally aired on Q (now GTV)
^  Originally aired on Knowledge Channel
^  Originally aired on NBN (now PTV)
^  Originally aired on Kapamilya Channel

GMA

The following are programs that debuted on GMA Network:

Re-runs

Notes
^  Originally aired on GTV
^  Originally aired on GMA News TV (now GTV)
^  Originally aired on Q (now GTV)

TV5

The following are programs that debuted on TV5:

Re-runs

Notes
^  Originally aired on ABS-CBN
^  Originally aired on Yey!

State-owned networks

PTV

The following are programs that debuted on People's Television Network:
 April 5: Kasama Hollywood Movies
 June 12: Isumbong Mo Kay Tulfo
 September 6: Hollywood Hits
 December 3: Sundown (season 2)

IBC

The following are programs that debuted on IBC:
 March 7: Lakbay Pinas
 May 8: Oras ng Kings
 October 25: IBC Headliners (2nd incarnation)
 November 14: Minning Town

Minor networks
The following are programs that debuted on minor networks:

Other channels
The following are programs that debuted on other channels:

Unknown (dates)
 February: Ang Inyong Armed Forces, Ang Inyong Kawal, News Express, News in 3, Up Up Pilipinas and WEmen on tvQ2
 March–April: #KKO, Balik Loob sa Pagbabago, Brakefast and The Tito Potato Show on tvQ2
 October: One Balita Pilipinas (noontime and primetime editions) on One News

Re-runs

Notes
^  Originally aired on ABS-CBN
^  Originally aired on GMA
^  Originally aired on TV5
^  Originally aired on Cine Mo!
^  Originally aired on Yey!
^  Originally aired on S+A
^  Originally aired on GMA News TV (now GTV)
^  Originally aired on Jeepney TV
^  Originally aired on Sari-Sari Channel
^  Originally aired on Hero (now defunct)
^  Originally aired on ETC
^  Originally aired on Jack TV (now defunct)
^  Originally aired on 2nd Avenue (now defunct)
^  Originally aired on CT (now defunct)
^  Originally aired on Studio 23 (now S+A)
^  Originally aired on Q (now GTV)
^  Originally aired on RPN (now CNN Philippines)
^  Originally aired on Fox Filipino (now defunct)
^  Originally aired on Kapamilya Channel
^  Originally aired on Metro Channel
^  Originally aired on Asianovela Channel
^  Originally aired on NBN (now PTV)
^  Originally aired on Knowledge Channel
^  Originally aired on CNN Philippines
^  Originally aired on A2Z
^  Originally aired on GTV
^  Originally aired on IBC
^  Originally aired on ABC (now TV5)

Video streaming services
The following are programs that debuted on video streaming services:

Unknown (dates)
 January: Alpha News on Alpha News Philippines
 January: Balitaktakan, Bicol.PH, Luzon Headlines and Talk Time on RNG

Returning or renamed programs

Major networks

State-owned networks

Minor networks

Other channels

Video streaming services

Programs transferring networks

Major networks

State-owned networks

Other channels

Video streaming services

Milestone episodes
The following shows that made their milestone episodes in 2021:

Finales

Major networks

A2Z

The following are programs that ended on A2Z:

Stopped airing

GMA

The following are programs that ended on GMA Network:

Stopped airing

TV5

The following are programs that ended on TV5:

Stopped airing

Cancelled
 January 8: Chika, Besh! (reason: Program failed to renew its contract resulting to the cancellation. Replaced by the extension of TV5 Kids block beginning January 11.)

State-owned networks

PTV

The following are programs that ended on People's Television Network:
 August 31: Oras Ng Himala
 September 24: Counterpoint with Secretary Salvador Panelo

Stopped airing

IBC

The following are programs that ended on IBC:
 July 31: Oras ng Kings

Stopped airing

Minor networks
 February 12: Eagle News International Filipino Edition on Net 25
 May 28: Eat's Singing Time on Net 25
 May 29: Ikaw ay Akin on Net 25
 August 13: Agila Pilipinas and Eagle News America on Net 25
 August 27: Pambansang Almusal on Net 25
 October 8: Piskante ng Bayan on Net 25
 October 15: Happy Time on Net 25

Stopped airing

Other channels

Unknown (dates)
 August: #KKO, Ang Inyong Armed Forces, Ang Inyong Kawal, Balik Loob sa Pagbabago, Brakefast, News Express, News in 3, The Tito Potato Show, Up Up Pilipinas and WEmen on tvQ2

Stopped airing

Cancelled
 January 8: Chika, Besh! on Colours (reason: Program failed to renew its contract resulting to the cancellation.)
 April 14: Chinatown News TV (CNTV) on ABS-CBN News Channel (reason: ABS-CBN and Horizon of the Sun Communications, Inc. received numerous backlash and heavily criticism, as well as negative reactions from its public viewers and netizens amid the disputed foreign territorial and relationship ties between the Philippines and China resulting to their partnership's termination.)

Video streaming services

Networks
The following are a list of free-to-air and cable channels or networks launches and closures in 2021.

Launches

Rebranded
The following is a list of television stations or cable channels that have made or will make noteworthy network rebrands in 2021.

Closures

Stopped broadcasting
The following is a list of stations and channels or networks that have stopped broadcasting or (temporarily) off the air in 2021.

Cancelled
The following is a list of television stations or cable channels that have the network cancellation in 2021.

Notes
 : via Sky Cable since November 15
 : via Sky Cable since November 27
 : via G Sat since December 6
 : via Sky Cable since October 18
 : via G Sat since February 10
 : via Cablelink since October 1
 : On January 1, Sky Cable terminated the network due to the expiration of its contract
 : On January 4, Cablelink terminated the network due to the expiration of its contract and unpaid carriage fee
 : On January 2, Cignal terminated the network due to the expiration of its contract

Services
The following are a list of television operators or providers and streaming media platforms or services launches and closures in 2021.

Launches

Rebranded
The following is a list of streaming providers that have made or will make noteworthy service rebrands in 2021.

Closures

Deaths
February
 February 11 – Eli Soriano, (b. 1947), televangelist and host of Ang Dating Daan.
 February 19 – Vincent Arboleda, (b. 1987), UNTV News reporter.

April
 April 9 – Totoy Talastas, (b. 1928), radio and television broadcaster.
 April 22 – Edwin Sevidal, (b. 1971), DZMM field reporter.
 April 23 – Victor Wood, (b. 1946), singer and host of Beautiful Sunday.

May
 May 1 – Le Chazz, (b. 1977), comedian and TV host.
 May 4 – Ricky Lo, (b. 1946), veteran entertainment columnist and TV host.

June
 June 23 – Shalala, (b. 1960), comedian, radio and television personality.

July
 July 14 – Hans Mortel, (b. 1972), comedian and TV host.
 July 26 – Ate Shawie, (b. 1976), impersonator, comedian and television personality.
 July 30 – Manuel Morato, (b. 1933), former MTRCB chairman, PCSO board of director and host of Dial-M.
 July 31 – Arlene de Castro, (b. 1955), former vice president for current affairs of ABS-CBN News and CEO of Bayan Productions.

August
 August 4 – Kitchie Benedicto, (b. 1947), veteran producer and director.
 August 17 – Jun del Rosario, (b. 1959), veteran journalist.
 August 31 – Mahal, (b. 1974), comedienne.

October
 October 2 – Leo Obligar, (b. 1938), radio and television personality.

November
 November 21 – Bert de Leon, (b. 1947), television director.

December
 December 20 – Arlyn dela Cruz, (b. 1970), broadcast journalist and filmmaker.

See also
 2021 in television

References

 
Television in the Philippines by year
Philippine television-related lists